Marta Skulme; (May 13, 1890 – January 3, 1962) was the first professional Latvian woman sculptor. She was a member of the Riga Artists Group.

Biography 
Marta Skulme was born on May 13, 1890, in Mālpils Municipality in a family of a farmer.

Skulme studied at Art School in Kazan (1912–1914) and at Tavricheskaya Art School in Petrograd (1914–1918) under the guidance of sculptor Leonid Sherwood. She worked mainly in small forms of sculpture, although she possessed excellent gift of a monumentalist (in 1924 she shared the 1st prize with Kārlis Zāle in the competition for the Freedom Monument). The plastic art of Marta Skulme has developed to artistic generalization. Her images possess elements of spiritual balance, inner nobility. The sculptress worked in different materials (granite, bronze, wood), however the majority of her sculptures are performed in plaster castings. She participated in exhibitions since 1920. Her works have been presented at the republican, USSR exhibitions and abroad.

Marta Skulme died on January 3, 1962, in Riga. She was buried on January 7, 1962, at the Riga Forest Cemetery.

Selected works 
Sculptural portraits:
 "Portrait of Father", 1923
 "Head of a Woman", 1930
 "Portrait of Džemma", 1940
 "Portrait of Teodors Zaļkalns", 1952
 "Portrait of Academician Lidija Liepiņa", 1960

Figurative compositions:
 "Woman from Vidzeme", 1928
 "Sheafbinder", 1949
 "Sack Carrier", 1950
 "Successors", 1957

External links 
 Excerpt from documentary “Amazon of avant-garde: Marta Liepina-Skulme”

References 

1890 births
1962 deaths
People from Mālpils Municipality
People from the Governorate of Livonia
Latvian sculptors
Latvian women sculptors
Modern sculptors
20th-century sculptors
20th-century Latvian women artists
20th-century Latvian artists
Burials at Forest Cemetery, Riga